{{DISPLAYTITLE:C30H54}}
The molecular formula C30H54 may refer to:

 Baccharane
 Cucurbitane
 Dammarane
 Dinosterane
 Euphane
 24-Isopropylcholestane
 Lanostane
 24-n-Propylcholestane
 Protostane
 Tirucallane